Lactarius fuliginellus is a species of fungus in the family Russulaceae. Described as a new species in 1962 by American mycologists Alexander H. Smith and Lexemuel Ray Hesler, the mushroom is found in North America.

See also
List of Lactarius species

References

External links

fuliginosus
Fungi described in 1962
Fungi of North America
Taxa named by Alexander H. Smith